Sinait, officially the Municipality of Sinait, is a 3rd class municipality in the province of Ilocos Sur, Philippines. According to the 2020 census, it has a population of 25,998 people.

History

Before Magellan discovered the Philippines in 1521, the locality was only a small village of little over a hundred natives who were called "Tirongs." By nature, these primitive inhabitants were sea-faring warlike. In their fast and picturesque sailboats, they traveled to adjoining and distant places, most particularly to settlements and villages along the Ilocos Coast in Ilocos Norte, Ilocos Sur, La Union, Pangasinan and even Zambales. In those adventures, the “Tirongs “ always challenged the people encountered to tribal wars and fought small battles against them. Often, those sturdy and brave natives came out victorious. Even in their daily chores, those people showed their ferocious characteristics. When the renowned Iberians came, Salcedo was sent to explore and colonized the Ilocos territory during the early years of the Spanish regime, he found the “Tirongs” of Sinait in apogee of the social state. Small battles were daily occurrence so that in the year 1535, when the locality was organized and established as a “Pueblo” Salcedo named the new community as “SIN-NAIT”, a word in the local tongue which means “CONTEST”. As a pueblo, SINAIT embraced and included in its territorial limit such as distant places as RANCHERA DE PAUR”, now the Municipality of Nueva Era in Ilocos Norte and Southern barrios of Badoc of the same Province. The vast territory, however, was reduced to present 78 square kilometers. In the year 1575, the natives fully realized the hardships of pronouncing the term “SIN-NAIT” and to go away with the trouble, Salcedo declared that one of the letter “N” be dropped. Since then, this Municipality has been called “SINAIT”. Nevertheless, it was only in 1913 when the same was “deeded” by the government upon the initiative of the late Don Calixto Cabacungan so that the Municipality Council enacted a resolution to that effect, that SINAIT was adopted as official name of the community to which said resolution was duly approved by the Provincial board of Ilocos Sur and by the Defunct Philippine Legislature.

The Santo Cristo Milagroso
Sinait houses the Sanctuary of the Miraculous Statue of the Black Nazarene (El Santo Cristo Milagroso), fondly called by its residents as "Apo Lakay," and a treasure of Ilocandia.  History traces the life-sized statue to Nagasaki, Japan. It was probably sent floating in the sea by missionaries operating in secret in Japan (for fear of persecution during the Tokugawa Bakufu). The box was found by local fishermen in the shores of Barangay Dadalaquiten Norte, on the boundary between Sinait and nearby Paguetpet (La Virgen Milagrosa), Badoc, in the year 1620, and fishermen from both towns carried it ashore.  They found two statues inside the box—a statue of the Black Nazarene, and a statue of the Blessed Virgin Mary.  According to legend, The fishermen from Sinait mysteriously were unable to move the statue of the Blessed Virgin Mary, but had no problems moving the Statue of the Black Nazarene.  The fishermen from Badoc, however, were able to move the Statue of the Blessed Virgin Mary (later called the La Virgen Milagrosa) with ease, as they were unable to carry the image of the Black Nazarene.  They took the statues to their respective towns and were venerated.  In 1656, with a spreading devotion to the Santo Cristo Milagroso due to its miraculous powers, the Black Crucifix was taken to the capital town of Vigan, since an epidemic was raging there and through the devotion of the faithful, many got cured. Because of this, it is considered as an intercessor of all kinds of affliction and sickness. In 1660, because of the growing veneration to the image, the faithful begun the construction of a permanent edifice to house it. It took the people of Sinait eight years to construct the church with funds provides by the Spanish Audiencia.  Today the landing site of Apo Lakay is marked by a chapel at Lugo Beach in Barangay Dadalaquiten Norte, and is a place of pilgrimage for devotees, as with the nearby chapel marking La Virgen Milagrosa's landing site.

Geography

Barangays
Sinait is politically subdivided into 44 barangays. These barangays are headed by elected officials: Barangay Captain, Barangay Council, whose members are called Barangay Councilors. All are elected every three years.

Climate

Demographics

In the 2020 census, Sinait had a population of 25,998.

Economy 

As major producer of Garlic, Sinait is also known as the Garlic Center of the North.

Tourism

 Sinait Public Market - On certain days garlic from the municipality and even the neighboring municipalities of Badoc and Pinili in neighboring Ilocos Norte are traded here.
 Barangay Pug-os/Dean Leopoldo Yabes - Barangay Pug-os was renamed as Barangay Dean Leopoldo Yabes, in honor of the Ilocano writer and dean from the University of the Philippines who once lived in Sinait.
 Cabangtalan (Imelda's Cove) - Features white sand beaches.  It is located on the way to Barangay Dadalaquiten Norte and Paguetpet (Badoc).
 Basilica of Saint Nicholas de Tolentino and Shrine of El Santo Cristo Milagroso - A Roman Catholic church, and a minor basilica, that houses the Miraculous Statue of the Black Nazarene (El Santo Cristo Milagroso) or "Apo Lakay." On May 3, 2021, Archbishop Marlo Peralta of the Archdiocese of Nueva Segovia announced that Pope Francis elevated the church to the rank of minor basilica during a Mass. On February 16, 2022, it was officially declared as a minor basilica in a Eucharistic Celebration presided by the Apostolic Nuncio to the Philippines Archbishop Charles John Brown and concelebrated by Archbishop of Nueva Segovia Marlo Mendoza Peralta and Archbishop of Lingayen-Dagupan Socrates Villegas with Archbishop of Manila Jose Fuerte Cardinal Advincula as the homilist, and also attended by Archbishop-emeritus of Cotabato Orlando Beltran Cardinal Quevedo and six other bishops from Northern Luzon.
 Barangay Dadalaquiten Norte - The landing place of the Miraculous Statue of the Black Nazarene in 1620, close to the landing place of the La Virgen Milagrosa in neighboring Paguetpet, Badoc, Ilocos Norte.
 Libunao Protected Landscape -  A protected watershed area in Barangay Nagcullooban.
 Sinait National High School - One of the largest secondary schools in Ilocos Sur.
 Calanutian - Homeplace of Inez Cannoyan the wife of Lam-Ang in the fictional Ilocano Story Biag ni Lam-Ang
 Lugo Beach - A summer destination located at Dadalaquiten Norte, where the Dadalaquiten Floating Cottages are found.  The place where the Santo Cristo Milagroso was carried ashore when it was found (with the La Virgen Milagrosa). 
 Cabulalaan Hills - A hiking destination.

Government
Sinait, belonging to the first congressional district of the province of Ilocos Sur, is governed by a mayor designated as its local chief executive and by a municipal council as its legislative body in accordance with the Local Government Code. The mayor, vice mayor, and the councilors are elected directly by the people through an election which is being held every three years.

Elected officials

References

External links

Pasyalang Ilocos Sur
Philippine Standard Geographic Code
Philippine Census Information
Sinait National High School - Official Website
Local Governance Performance Management System

Municipalities of Ilocos Sur